Andreas Johannes Köstenberger (born November 2, 1957), usually cited as Andreas J. Köstenberger, is Research Professor at Midwestern Baptist Theological Seminary. Until 2018, he was Senior Research Professor of New Testament and Biblical Theology at Southeastern Baptist Theological Seminary (SEBTS) in Wake Forest, North Carolina. His primary research interests are the Gospel of John, biblical theology, and hermeneutics.

Life 
Köstenberger was born on November 2, 1957, in Vienna, Austria, where he was raised in the Roman Catholic Church. As a young man, Köstenberger converted to Evangelicalism. 

At the age of twenty-seven, Köstenberger left Austria for the United States to pursue theological studies at Columbia Bible College and Graduate School of Missions. In 1990 Köstenberger began doctoral studies at Trinity Evangelical Divinity School under D. A. Carson, submitting his dissertation on the mission motif in the Gospel of John in 1993.

Köstenberger then taught at Briercrest Bible College for two years, returned to Trinity for a one-year teaching position to cover for D. A. Carson while he was on sabbatical (during which time, in 1996, Köstenberger received an "Award for Scholarly Productivity" from Trinity), and then took a teaching position at Southeastern Baptist Theological Seminary (SEBTS) in 1996, where he was Senior Research Professor of New Testament and Biblical Theology. 

He was for 22 years editor of the Journal of the Evangelical Theological Society and founder of Biblical Foundations, an organization that "exists to strengthen the biblical foundations of the family, the church, and society."

Notes

References

External links 
 Twitter profile
 Biblical Foundations - Köstenberger's website and blog at the official domain – includes list of publications.

American Baptist theologians
Living people
Academic journal editors
Editors of Christian publications
Trinity Evangelical Divinity School alumni
Vienna University of Economics and Business alumni
1957 births
Columbia International University alumni
People from Vienna
New Testament scholars
Baptist biblical scholars
Austrian Baptists
Austrian Protestant theologians
Austrian expatriates in the United States
Austrian evangelicals
Converts to evangelical Christianity from Roman Catholicism